Zhang Wei (born 2 December 1977) is a former Chinese badminton player. Zhang was selected to join the national team in 1997. He played in the men's doubles event partnered with Zhang Jun. He participated in four consecutive Sudirman Cup, winning 3 gold medals in 1999, 2001, 2005, and a silver medal in 2003. He and Zhang Jun was qualified to compete at the 2000 Summer Olympics, but because of the injury on his left abdominal muscles while doing the exercises, he missed the event. He retired from the national team in 2005, and started to playing in Denmark. He returned to Shanghai in 2007, and star coaching the Shanghai team. He also competed for Shanghai at the 2009 National Games.

Achievements

World Championships 
Men's doubles

Asian Championships 
Men's doubles

Asian Cup 
Men's doubles

World Junior Championships 
Mixed doubles

IBF World Grand Prix
The World Badminton Grand Prix sanctioned by International Badminton Federation (IBF) since 1983.

Men's doubles

IBF International
Mixed doubles

References

External links
 张尉 Zhang Wei at www.badmintoncn.com

1977 births
Living people
Badminton players from Shanghai
Chinese male badminton players
Badminton players at the 2002 Asian Games
Badminton players at the 1998 Asian Games
Asian Games silver medalists for China
Asian Games bronze medalists for China
Asian Games medalists in badminton
Chinese badminton coaches
Medalists at the 1998 Asian Games
Medalists at the 2002 Asian Games